Reza is a drama film directed by Alireza Motamedi. This film was screened for the first time in 2017 at the 36th Fajr International Film Festival. The public screening of the film has started on March 11, 2017, in the Art and Experience group.

Critic Feedback 
Deborah Young, a Hollywood Reporter writer who watched the film at the Fajr International Film Festival, described in a note that the "obsessive initiative of films like Reza" was "a sign of the modernity of Iranian cinema." He went on to say that the prolongation of the film's plans is boring. Majid Eslami called the film "one of the most exciting first films" of recent years in Iranian cinema and described its stage design as "brilliant."

Casts 

 Alireza Motamedi as Reza
 Sahar Dolatshahi as Fati
 Reza Davoodnejad
 Setareh Pasyani as Wazir
 Afsar Asadi
 Farzam as Nima

References

External links 
 
 Persian Wikipedia

2017 films
2010s Persian-language films
Iranian drama films
2017 drama films
Films directed by Alireza Motamedi